Luang Namtha (Luang Nam Tha) (Lao: ມ. ຫລວງນໍ້າທາ) is a district as well as the capital of Luang Namtha Province in northern Laos. The city lies on the Tha River (Nam Tha).

Luang Namtha is a popular tourist destination, and a base for treks, biking to the surrounding hill tribe villages. The Luang Namtha Museum is in the town.

History
From January through May 1962, troops from the Royal Lao Army (RLA) fought the Pathet Lao and People's Army of Vietnam in the Battle of Luang Namtha. The battle ended with the RLA's headlong retreat southward 150 kilometers across the Mekong River.

Transport 
In the rainy season, Luang Namtha can be reached by boat from the Mekong River. It is connected by Highway 3 to both the Thai border at Houayxay-Chiang Khong, the Chinese border at Boten-Mengla County, and the Burmese border at Xieng Kok-Kenglat.

Gallery

References

External links
 
 
 Biodiversity Profile for Luang Namtha Province, 2003
 Ethnic diversity in Luang Namtha  - Laos
 Facebook photo gallery

 
Populated places in Luang Namtha Province